The 1947 Aden riots were three days of violence in which the Jewish community of Aden (in modern-day Yemen) was attacked by members of the Yemeni-Arab community in early December, following the approval of the United Nations Partition Plan for Palestine on 29 November 1947. It was one of the most violent pogroms in modern times against Mizrahi-Jewish communities in the Middle East, resulting in the deaths of 76–82 Jews, 33 Arabs, 4 Muslim Indians, and one Somali, as well as wide-scale devastation of the local Jewish community of Aden.

The riots were a significant embarrassment for the British government, particularly given that the British-raised Aden Protectorate Levies were blamed for causing many unnecessary deaths.

Background

By the mid-20th century, Aden was under British rule (today part of Yemen) and had a community of around 5,000 Jews living alongside the Muslim population. In the 1930s, there were rare religiously-motivated outbreaks of anti-Jewish violence, as well as a relatively small riot in May 1932 in which Muslims accused Jews of throwing excrement into a mosque courtyard. Sixty people, including 25 Jews, were injured, but there were no fatalities. The Farhi synagogue was desecrated. 

In the 1940s, visits of Palestinian Arabs to Aden and expressions of anti-Jewish sentiments became common. The Adenese-educated Arab population had become exposed to Egyptian newspapers, as well as radio broadcasts of Voice of the Arabs from Cairo, which incited political awareness and prepared the grounds for the anti-Jewish riot of November 1947 and later the 1967 withdrawal of the last British forces.

United Nations Partition Plan for Palestine

On 29 November 1947, the United Nations General Assembly adopted Resolution 181(II), titled: "Recommendation to the United Kingdom, as the mandatory Power for Palestine, and to all other Members of the United Nations the adoption and implementation, with regard to the future government of Palestine, of the Plan of Partition with Economic Union".

This was an attempt to resolve the Arab-Jewish conflict by partitioning Mandatory Palestine into "Independent Arab and Jewish States and the Special International Regime for the City of Jerusalem". Following the vote by the UN on partition of Mandatory Palestine, wide scale protests took place across the Arab countries and communities, with Aden being no exception.

Riots
The riots occurred in December 1947, several days after the United Nations' approval of the partition plan.

On 2 December, a three-day strike was called to protest the decision. Demonstrations in the Jewish quarter of Aden led to stone and bottle throwing between Jews and Muslims. Jewish houses and shops were looted, and military control was declared when the crisis exceeded the capacity of the small police force. The main military force available was the 1,800-strong Aden Protectorate Levies who were locally recruited soldiers with British and Arab officers. Assistance was also received from several British warships, which sent landing parties, and the equivalent of two companies of British infantry flown in from the Canal Zone. Order was not restored until 6 December. The British government was severely embarrassed by the riots, noting privately that they were urging the Arab states to protect their Jews when they themselves were unable to.

On the second day, rifle fire began. The Levies proved unreliable and worse; some fired indiscriminately and probably contributed to the casualties.

The main violence of the riots occurred in three locations. In Aden town (also called Crater), an attempt to impose a curfew was largely unsuccessful. Jewish schools and houses were looted and set alight. In the port towns of Steamer Point and Tawahi, most of the Jews were evacuated but some whose presence was not known to the police were killed. Several Arabs who were apparently innocent were shot accidentally. In the Arab town of Sheikh Othman, which had a large Jewish compound, a military contingent arrived to evacuate the 750 Jews to safety. However, several declined to leave and were later found dead.

Casualties 
The official casualty count was 76–82 Jews (6 persons were unidentified) and 38 Arabs killed, and 76 Jews wounded. At least 87 Arabs were known to have been wounded but many others failed to report their condition. The dead included one Indian Medical Officer and one Levy.

More than 100 Jewish shops were looted and 30 houses burned. An official enquiry conducted by Sir Harry Trusted determined that many individual Levies were sympathetic to the rioters and did not act to control them. Nine Levies were imprisoned for looting. Trusted put most of the blame on Yemeni "coolies," workers temporarily in the country who "have a low standard of life, are illiterate, fanatical and, when excited, may be savage." He did not find claims of Jewish sniping to be convincing, though the Governor Sir Reginald Champion secretly reported to the British government that the two military fatalities were killed "almost certainly by Jewish sniper."  Jewish leaders acknowledged "many instances of Arabs and Indians sheltering and otherwise befriending their Jewish neighbours."

Aftermath

The Aden government established a second enquiry, under magistrate K. Bochgaard, to consider claims for compensation. Claims totalling more than one million pounds were submitted, exceeding the total annual income of the colony. On the grounds that most of the damage was inflicted by non-residents of Aden, Bochgaard awarded £240,000 with a maximum of £7,500 per claim. The Aden government then further reduced the maximum per claim to £300 with some options for interest-free loans, much to the anger of the Aden Jewish community.

Shortly after the riots, Aden's Jewish community almost entirely left, together with most of the Yemeni Jewish community.

See also
1945 Cairo pogrom
1945 Tripoli pogrom
Farhud
Grand Synagogue of Aden, was destroyed during the 1947 Aden riots

References 

Jews and Judaism in Aden
Mass murder in 1947
Anti-Jewish pogroms by Muslims 1941-49
Antisemitism in Yemen
Ethnic riots
1947–1948 civil war in Mandatory Palestine

20th century in the Colony of Aden
1947 in Asia
1947 in the British Empire
December 1947 events in Asia
1947 riots
1947 in Judaism
Massacres in Yemen
Massacres in 1947